Central Greece (colloquially known as Ρούμελη (Roúmeli)) is one of the thirteen administrative regions of Greece. The region occupies the eastern half of the traditional region of Central Greece, including the island of Euboea. To the south it borders the regions of Attica and the Peloponnese, to the west the region of West Greece and to the north the regions of Thessaly and Epirus. Its capital city is Lamia.

Administration
The region was established in the 1987 administrative reform. With the 2010 Kallikratis plan, its powers and authority were redefined and extended. Along with Thessaly, it is supervised by the Decentralized Administration of Thessaly and Central Greece based at Larissa. The region is based at Lamia and is divided into five regional units (pre-Kallikratis prefectures), Boeotia, Euboea, Evrytania, Phocis and Phthiotis, which are further subdivided into 25 municipalities.

Economy 
The Gross domestic product (GDP) of the province was 8.8 billion € in 2018, accounting for 4.7% of the Greek economic output. GDP per capita adjusted for purchasing power was 18,900 € or 63% of the EU27 average in the same year. The GDP per employee was 81% of the EU average. Central Greece is the region in Greece with the fourth highest GDP per capita.

Demographics
The region has shrunk by 42,121 people between 2011 and 2021, experiencing a population loss of 7.7%.

Towns
Biggest towns in each regional unit, according to the census of 2011 (only communities with population more than 2,000 recorded):

References

External links

  

1987 establishments in Greece
 
NUTS 2 statistical regions of the European Union
States and territories established in 1987
Administrative regions of Greece